Mount Mansfield Modified Union School District (MMUUSD), formerly the Mount Mansfield Union School District #17, is a school district headquartered in Jericho, Vermont.

It is the district farthest east in Chittenden County, Vermont.  There are approximately 2600 students enrolled in the district.

Each town in the district has its own elementary school, which serves K-4th grade.

Students from Huntington, Bolton and Richmond attend Camels Hump Middle School. Those from Jericho and Underhill attend Browns River Middle School. Both middle schools serve grades 5-8.

The district's high school is Mount Mansfield Union High School, located in Jericho, which takes students graduating from both middle schools, and serves grades 9-12.

History
The predecessor districts were in the Chittenden East Supervisory Union (CESU), which was their umbrella organization. In a span of ten years the residents of the predecessor districts voted on whether to merge their school districts on five occasions. The vote that day favored consolidation. The district was established effective November 4, 2014. The merged district began operations the following year.

In 2011 there was a vote among the towns on whether to merge that did not pass. Another such vote was scheduled in 2014. The district formed with the voluntary merger of the Bolton, Jericho, Richmond, and Underhill school districts. When MMUUSD formed, Huntington residents already had representation as the community sent its secondary students there, but Huntington continued to have its own elementary school district.

Residents of Huntington resisted merging for a longer time, with four unsuccessful votes on merging into MMUUSD. At one point the state of Vermont passed Act 46 that obligated school districts to merge. The Huntington School District sued the state government to try to stop the merger. In 2018 the Huntington district filed its third lawsuit against mergers. On June 6, 2019, the vote to merge Huntington into Mount Mansfield succeeded on a 450-191 basis; the Chittenden East Supervisory Union dissolved as a result.

Schools
 High school
 Mount Mansfield Union High School
 Middle schools
Browns River Middle School
Camels Hump Middle School
 Elementary schools
 Brewster-Pierce Memorial School (Huntington) - In 2019 it had 136 students.
 Jericho Elementary School
 Richmond Elementary School
 Smilie Memorial School
 Underhill Central School
 Preschool
 Underhill ID Preschool

 Former schools
 Underhill-Jericho School - In 2018 the board voted to close the school effective 2019, with eight members favoring and five opposing. Students were moved to Jericho Elementary School and Underhill Central School.

References

Further reading
 Bolton School District; Huntington School District; Jericho School District; Richmond School District; Underhill Town School District; Underhill ID School District; Mount Mansfield Union School District #17 Regional Education District (RED) Planning Committee Report - Vermont Legislature

External links
 Mount Mansfield Modified Union School District
 

School districts in Vermont
Richmond, Vermont
Bolton, Vermont
Huntington, Vermont
Jericho, Vermont
Underhill, Vermont
2014 establishments in Vermont
School districts established in 2014
Chittenden East Supervisory Union
Education in Chittenden County, Vermont